The men's 100 metres event at the 1995 Summer Universiade was held on 31 August – 1 September at the Hakatanomori Athletic Stadium in Fukuoka, Japan.

Medalists

Results

Heats
Qualification: First 3 of each heat (Q) and the next 7 fastest (q) qualified for the quarterfinals.

Wind:Heat 1: -1.3 m/s, Heat 2: -1.0 m/s, Heat 3: -1.5 m/s, Heat 4: -0.3 m/s, Heat 5: -2.8 m/s, Heat 6: -2.8 m/sHeat 7: -1.0 m/s, Heat 8: -1.4 m/s, Heat 9: -1.2 m/s, Heat 10: +0.5 m/s, Heat 11: +0.7 m/s

Quarterfinals
Qualification: First 3 of each heat (Q) and the next 1 fastest (q) qualified for the semifinals.

Wind:Heat 1: -1.1 m/s, Heat 2: +1.1 m/s, Heat 3: -0.5 m/s, Heat 4: -0.3 m/s, Heat 5: -0.4 m/s

Semifinals
Qualification: First 4 of each semifinal qualified directly (Q) for the final.

Wind:Heat 1: +3.0 m/s, Heat 2: +2.0 m/s

Final
Wind: +1.3 m/s

References

Athletics at the 1995 Summer Universiade
1995